Lukinskaya is a rural locality (a village) in Tarnogskoye Rural Settlement, Tarnogsky District, Vologda Oblast, Russia. The population was 23 as of 2002.

Geography 
Lukinskaya is located 10 km northeast of Tarnogsky Gorodok (the district's administrative centre) by road. Rylkovskaya is the nearest rural locality.

References 

Rural localities in Tarnogsky District